Adriaan Mauritz Jacobs (born ) is a rugby referee on the Premier Panel of the South African Rugby Union.

Career

He played for the Griffons Under-20 and Under-21 side in the respective provincial championships between 2004 and 2006.

He qualified as a teacher and, while still playing club rugby, also started refereeing high school matches. He was persuaded to prioritise refereeing over playing and joined the Griffons Referees' Society in 2010. He quickly progressed to the South African Rugby Referees' Association's National Panel.

He refereed in some matches during the 2014 SARU Community Cup, 2014 Under-19 Provincial Championship and 2015 Varsity Shield competitions and made his first class debut by taking charge of the  versus  match in Polokwane. He also officiated in the 2015 Under-18 International Series and in the 2015 Under-21 Provincial Championship.

He took charge of his first match in the Premier Division of the Currie Cup of 19 September 2015, when he officiated the  versus  match in Bloemfontein.

References

1985 births
Living people
Currie Cup referees
Sportspeople from Welkom
SARU referees
South African rugby union referees
Super Rugby referees